"Aydın Karşılaması" (in ) is a  Greek and Turkish  folkloric tune  Karsilamas.

Greek Lyrics

Kiria Koula Lyrics
Γιάλα, έλα, ααχ, ααχ, αμάν ααχ
-Ωωχ. γεια σου Κούλα μου, γεια σου !

σε περίμενα ένα βράδυ
αχ κι αν με τύχει και γλεντώ

μια και μ' έχει αποθαμένο
αχ μ' έγινε και ζωντανό

-Ωωχ, γεια σου Βαγγελάκη Ναυτάκη!

See also 
Karsilamas
Yaman Ayşem
Ayşem Ayşem Mor Menekşem
Bülbül olsam kona da bilsem dallere
Gel Gel Aman
Aise

References

Turkish music
Turkish songs
Greek songs
Songwriter unknown
Year of song unknown